Allt-A-Bhainne distillery (meaning 'milk burn') is a Scotch whisky distillery in the Speyside Region of Scotland. It is located just down the road from the well-known whisky town of Dufftown. Allt-a-bhaine is one of the newer distilleries in Scotland, having been built in 1975. It was the first distillery to be designed with modernity in mind. All the equipment is in one room and the process from start to finish can be accomplished by one person.

Products
The Allt-A-Bhainne spirit is the main malt ingredient of the Chivas Regal blended Scotch.  The distillery, like most, does not bottle on site. There was a short lived single malt offering in the late 2010's although was only on the market for a few years.

References

Distilleries in Scotland
Companies based in Moray